Suillus ochraceoroseus is a species of mushroom in the genus Suillus. It appears with larch in early summer, is edible, and similar in appearance to S. lakei.

Taxonomy
The species was first described by Wally Snell as Boletinus ochraceoroseus in 1941, based on specimens he had collected near Smith Creek in Idaho. René Pomerleau and Alexander H. Smith transferred it to Fuscoboletinus in 1962. In 1973, Rolf Singer transferred the species to Suillus.

Description
The cap is whitish then red, and dry and fibrillose, sometimes with buff veil remnants on the edge. The pores are yellow to brown. The stipe is yellowish with red-brown hues near the base, usually has a ring or ring zone, often hollow, with flesh staining blue-green.

References

External links

ochraceoroseus
Edible fungi
Fungi of North America
Fungi described in 1941